Tănase v. Moldova (application No. 7/08) was a case decided by the European Court of Human Rights in 2010.

Background
In 2008, Moldovan electoral law was changed to forbid persons with multiple citizenship from sitting in the parliament. That affected Alexandru Tănase, from the Liberal Democratic Party of Moldova. Having been elected in 2009, he was forced to refuse Romanian citizenship to take his seat.

He launched a complaint before the Court. Romania was admitted as a third party.

Judgments
In 2008, a Chamber of the Court decided that the provisions of Moldovan law violated Article 3 of Protocol No. 1 of the European Convention on Human Rights. The judgment was appealed by Moldova.

In 2010, the Grand Chamber unanimously found the ineligibility of persons with dual citizenship to violate Article 3 of Protocol No. 1. It was unanswered whether forbidding those with multiple nationalities from taking seats in Parliament pursued a legitimate aim.

It found the law to be disproportionate and in violation of Article 3 of Protocol No. 1.

See also
 Moldova–Romania relations
 Controversy over linguistic and ethnic identity in Moldova

References

Further reading
 Timmer A. Tănase v. Moldova: multiple readings of a case concerning multiple nationality Human Rights Centre of the Faculty of Law of Ghent University, 2010
  for comparison with similar cases.
ECtHR Chamber judgment
ECtHR Grand Chamber judgment

Article 3 of Protocol No. 1 of the European Convention on Human Rights
Moldovan nationality law
Elections in Moldova
European Court of Human Rights cases decided by the Grand Chamber
European Court of Human Rights cases involving Moldova
European Court of Human Rights cases involving Romania